.CSO is a compression method for the ISO image format. It is used to compress dumped PlayStation Portable UMD games, and is an alternative to the .DAX compression method. It is also sometimes called "CISO".

It was the first compression method for ISO. It was created so that more memory space can be saved. Booster created the first code; it was later optimized for better compression. Other formats tried to replace it by fixing up certain issues such as lag in games, such as .DAX and .JSO. However at the time, the popular application homebrew "DevHook" used CSO. .DAX needed another loader, and .JSO was basically unused.

CSO uses Deflate compression with nine levels of presets, usually with 2 KiB blocks handled individually (they could be uncompressed). While the highest levels of compression can introduce slowdown and lengthy load-times in software which relies heavily on disc streaming, even the lower levels are capable of substantial compression. This is partially due to the data layout of a UMD, though more frequently due to the use of Dummy Files as both an anti-piracy tool and a means to more optimally lay the data out physically on the disc.

In addition to being used for compressing PlayStation Portable UMD games, the PSP port of PicoDrive supports compressed Sega Mega-CD disc images in the CSO format.

Other formats 
CSO are known to have received later extensions in the form of CSO "v2" and ZSO ("ZISO"), using LZ4 compression for faster decompression.

DAX is a competing format, it uses 8 KiB blocks which aims to increase the data compression ratio, and it also allows uncompressed areas just like CSO. JSO ("JISO") was another now unpopular competing format that was overall similar to CSO, with the difference of added option for LZO compression and a block size tweakable in the official compressor. While CSO allows a tweakable block size, the official compressor does not allow changing it.

File structure 
The file format consists of a 24-byte header, an index table, and data blocks. Little-endian is assumed for fields larger than a byte, following the architecture endianness of PlayStation Portable.

Header

Index table 
The index table consists of multiple 4-byte entries, which indicate the position of each data block within the file. There is an additional, last entry which points to the end of file. The number of entries in the table can be calculated using the formula:
.

The content of each entry is as follows:

Data blocks 
Each data block contains uncompressed or compressed data. The actual size of each block is calculated by taking its position, and then subtracting it from the position of the following block. If the index alignment is greater than zero, it is possible that the block size is larger than the data it holds, necessitating the use of padding.

References

External links
 File Extension Details for .CSO
 .CSO description
 ciso, the original compressor (GPLv2)
 maxcso, an extended compressor
 ISO Compressor for CSO
 Ciso Multi Compressor
 CisoPlus

PlayStation Portable
CSO
Year of introduction missing